The Moscow River Cup was a WTA Tour International-level professional women's tennis tournament. It took place on outdoor clay courts, in July 2018 at the National Tennis Center of Juan Antonio Samaranch, in Moscow. The tournament will be replaced by Baltic Open.

The inaugural year's (2018) prize money was $750,000, a significantly higher amount than the usual norm at WTA International-level events.

Results

Singles

Doubles

References
 WTA tournament profile

 
Tennis tournaments in Russia
Sports competitions in Moscow
Clay court tennis tournaments
WTA Tour
2018 establishments in Russia
Defunct tennis tournaments in Europe
Defunct sports competitions in Russia